Jacquelynne (Jackie) Pement (born May 10, 1946 in Drumheller, Alberta) is a Canadian former politician, who represented the electoral district of Bulkley Valley-Stikine in the Legislative Assembly of British Columbia from 1991 to 1996. She was a member of the New Democratic Party.

She served as Minister of Transportation and Highways in the Executive Council of British Columbia from 1993 to 1996.

References

1946 births
Living people
British Columbia New Democratic Party MLAs
Women government ministers of Canada
Members of the Executive Council of British Columbia
People from Drumheller
Women MLAs in British Columbia
20th-century Canadian politicians
20th-century Canadian women politicians